A2 Ethniki Volleyball or Greek A2 Volleyball League is the third-tier of the Greek volleyball championship system in Greece. It used to be the second-tier until the founding of the Pre-league tier replacing A2 as the second tier making A2 the third one, since 2019. It was founded in 1988. The winner teams promoted to A1 Ethniki Volleyball. The championship is held in three groups of teams. The winner of each group plays in a play-off championship and the two best teams of play-off promoted to A1 Ethniki. The recent season, the winners are AEK Athens and AE Komotinis

Winners

1988–2017

2018–today

Performance by club

Current teams
The clubs taking part in the 2017–18 league are:

References

External links
Greek Volleyball Federation

Volleyball in Greece
Greece men2
Professional sports leagues in Greece